Avtozavodsky City District or Avtozavod is one of the eight districts of the city of Nizhny Novgorod, Russia. It is located in the southwest of the Lower City of Nizhny Novgorod, on the low left bank of the Oka River and has a land border with Leninsky City District to the north. It is also connected by the Myza Bridge with Prioksky City District in the Upper City (the right bank of the Oka). Population: 

History

The name of the district literally means "automotive plant district", as it grew around the production facilities of the Gorky Automobile Plant, which were constructed in this area in 1930–1932. The administrative district was created in 1931 from the land that formerly had been part of Kanavinsky City District and the suburban  Dzerzhinsky District. At the time, the district's population was around 30,000.

Transportation
The Strigino International Airport, four stations of the Metro and two stations of the City Rail is located within Avtozavodsky City District.

Notable people 
Natalia Vodianova

References

External links
Official website of Avtozavodsky City District 
Unofficial website of Avtozavodsky City District 

City districts of Nizhny Novgorod